Ștefan Bănică Jr. (born October 18, 1967, in Bucharest, Romania) is a Romanian entertainer, TV presenter, and son of actor Ștefan Bănică Sr. In his early career, he starred in multiple successful romance films (Liceenii, Liceenii Rock'n'Roll). He is well known in Romania for presenting the Romanian version of "Dancing with the Stars", the most long-lived dance competition ever aired in the country; broadcast on Pro TV; and for his role as a talent judge on The X Factor.

Later he concentrated on television acting, playing the character of Ciupanezu in the TV series Băieți buni ("Good Guys"), which aired on Pro TV in 2005. That same year, Bănică also played the role of Billy Flynn in the Romanian stage version of the Chicago musical (based on the play by Maurine Dallas Watkins) at the National Theatre in Bucharest.

He released several rock music albums, and successfully toured the country. In January 2006, he married television producer and show host Andreea Marin. In January 2013, they announced their divorce on amicable terms. They have a daughter together.

In 2006, he provided the Romanian voice of Ramone in the animated Disney Pixar film Cars.

References

External links
  Official site
  Unofficial site
 .
 Stefan Banica Jr: Eu cred ca scena inseamna emotie.

1967 births
Living people
20th-century Romanian male actors
21st-century Romanian male actors
Romanian male film actors
Romanian male pop singers
Romanian male television actors
Television people from Bucharest